The Tom Ewell Show, also known as The Trouble With Tom, is an American situation comedy that aired on CBS during the 1960-61 television season. It depicts the challenges a husband and father faces as he resides in a household otherwise consisting entirely of women and girls.

Synopsis
Tom Potter is a bumbling real estate agent who resides at 611 Elm Street in Las Palmas, California. As the only male member of his household, his entire life away from the office is dominated by females. Residing with him are his wife Fran; three daughters (15-year-old Carol, 11-year-old Debbie, and 7-year-old Sissie); Fran's mother, Grandma Irene Brady, a skeptic who Tom calls "Mother Brady;" the family dog, Mitzi; and a parakeet. Other people in Tom's life include his co-worker Howie Fletcher, his heavy-set friend Jim Rafferty, and Stanley, a neighborhood boy. Tom faces constant challenges as he tries to navigate life in a woman's world. A big sports fan, he longs for male companionship, but his attempts at male bonding often lead to problems at home with his wife, daughters, and mother-in-law.

Cast
 Tom Potter...Tom Ewell
 Fran Potter...Marilyn Erskine
 Grandma Irene Brady...Mabel Albertson
 Carol Potter...Cynthia Chenault (credited as Cindy Robbins)
 Debbie Potter...Sherry Alberoni
 Sissie Potter...Eileen Chesis
 Howie Fletcher...Norman Fell (recurring)
 Jim Rafferty...Barry Kelley (recurring)
 Stanley...Vance Meadows (recurring)
 Mitzi, the family dog...Mitzi (recurring)

Production notes
Comic actor Tom Ewell, who had starred in the romantic comedy film The Seven Year Itch with Marilyn Monroe in 1955 and the musical comedy The Girl Can't Help It with Jayne Mansfield and Edmond O'Brien in 1956, made his television debut in The Tom Ewell Show. Madelyn Martin and Bob Carroll, Jr. (of The Lucy Show fame) created the show, and Ewell's own production company produced it in partnership with Martin and Carroll and with  Four Star Productions. It was sponsored alternately  by The Quaker Oats Company and Procter & Gamble.

Sherry Alberoni, who played Debbie Potter, was a former Mouseketeer.

Critical reception
In a review published in its October 10, 1960, edition, TIME magazine said:
 "The Tom Ewell Show (CBS) leads a relentless parade of situation comedies, all designed to show that American family life is as cute as a freckle on a five-year-old. The show, which might also be titled Father Knows Nothing, presents the comic with the excavated face as a bumbler named Potter who is trapped in the customary format: Harassed Man Beaten Down by Wife, Three Daughters, Mother-in-Law. In the opening episode, Ewell could find no better way to outsmart his spendthrift women than closing his bank account and ruining his own credit. For those who may have tuned out early, the women were all set to start spending again."

After its debut in September 1960, The Tom Ewell Show struggled in the ratings. In an interview with Associated Press television critic Cynthia Lowry published on December 4, 1960, Ewell explained that he had examined early reviews of the show after its debut episode and found some positive ones, but also discovered that the negative reviews reflected two main concerns he also had about the show's writing and performances, i.e., that it depicted the Tom Potter character as "too much of a boob," with too great a focus on his ineptness rather than on "real comedy," and that it attempted "to play farce in a realistic situation" even though farce is not realistic, leading to an inappropriate tempo and defeating the effort at farce. Ewell promised that changes in the show's writing and acting to address these problems would be apparent beginning with the episode ("Site Unseen") broadcast on December 6, 1960. The Potter family pets, Mitzi the dog and a parakeet, also were dropped from the series, Ewell explaining that acting with the animals had proven not to be worth the effort.

The new approach Ewell described in December 1960 did not save The Tom Ewell Show. A television article carried in the April 4, 1961, edition of The Herald and Review of Decatur, Illinois, stated that "The Tom Ewell Show probably will be dropped in July [1961]."

Broadcast schedule
The Tom Ewell Show lasted a single season. Its 32 episodes were broadcast in the United States on CBS at 9:00 PM Eastern Time on Tuesday nights from September 27, 1960, through May 23, 1961. Eight of the episodes were shown as summer repeats in the same timeslot from May 30, 1961, through July 18, 1961.

Episodes
SOURCES

References

External links
 
 The Tom Ewell Show opening credits on YouTube

1960 American television series debuts
1961 American television series endings
1960s American sitcoms
Black-and-white American television shows
CBS original programming
English-language television shows
Television series about families
Television series by Four Star Television
Television shows set in California